Trileros is a 2003 Spanish comedy film directed by Antonio del Real and starring Juanjo Puigcorbé, Carlos Castel and Juan Echanove.

References

External links

2003 films
Spanish comedy films
2003 comedy films
2000s Spanish-language films
Films directed by Antonio del Real
2000s Spanish films